The 1980 United States presidential election in South Dakota took place on November 4, 1980. All 50 states and the District of Columbia were part of the 1980 United States presidential election. Voters chose four electors to the Electoral College, who voted for president and vice president.

South Dakota was won by former California Governor Ronald Reagan (R) by a 29-point landslide. It is a reliably Republican state, and the last Democratic presidential candidate to carry the state was Lyndon Johnson in 1964.

Results

Results by county

See also
 Presidency of Ronald Reagan
 United States presidential elections in South Dakota

References

South Dakota
1980
1980 South Dakota elections